Disney's Saratoga Springs Resort & Spa is a Disney Vacation Club (DVC) resort at the Walt Disney World Resort. The resort is the seventh Disney Vacation Club resort and is situated on the former site of the Disney Institute. It first opened on May 17, 2004 and was built in three phases. It is now the largest Disney Vacation Club resort. The resort was inspired by the city of Saratoga Springs, New York.

The  resort was designed by Graham Gund Architects of Cambridge, Massachusetts. There are a total of 18 Villa Buildings providing 828 Vacation Home Units (1,260 guest rooms), plus an additional 60 Treehouse Villas.

Available rooms range from single room studios to three bedroom extended family suites on two floors (Grand Villas).

In October 2007, the resort received designation in the Florida Green Lodging Program.

History
The resort opened in 4 phases:
 Phase 1: 4 Villa Buildings in one section called Congress Park opened with 184 Vacation Home units (280 guest rooms) on May 17, 2004.
 Phase 2: 8 Villa Buildings in two sections called The Springs and The Paddock started opening in Spring 2005 eventually adding 368 Vacation Home Units (560 guest rooms).
 Phase 3: 6 Villa Buildings in two sections called The Carousel and The Grandstand completed the (then) final phase of this large resort in Summer 2007, adding 276 Vacation Home Units (420 guest rooms).
Phase 4: Treehouse Villas built in natural forest glens with 60 three-bedroom homes opened on June 1, 2009. These stand-alone structures—elevated 10 feet off the ground on pedestals and beams—are nestled unobtrusively into natural glens alongside the Sassagoula River.

Spa and recreation 
The Disney's Saratoga Springs Resort & Spa offers a wide selection of recreational activities. These recreational activities include the main pool, three additional pools, a spa, a fitness center, bike and surrey rentals, an arcade, a "Community Hall" (arts, crafts, and entertainment center), and the Lake Buena Vista Golf Club.

Lake Buena Vista Golf Course is a 18-hole golf course and is certified by Audubon International as a Cooperative Wildlife Sanctuary. The course has been a host to PGA and LPGA events.

High Rock Spring Pool is the original feature pool of the resort located outside the main/clubhouse building. It is designed as a natural spring with rocks, geysers, trees, and other themed touches. and an adult bar called "On The Rocks Pool Bar" with pool chairs.

The Paddock Pool is a second feature pool. Added in 2011, it was built due to the increased guest capacity of the Saratoga Springs Resort.

Additional pools are also located in The Grandstand, Congress Park, and at the Treehouse Villas.

Transportation 
Disney's Saratoga Springs Resort & Spa is served by Disney Transport bus and watercraft transportation.

Disney Vacation Club Preview Center 
The Disney's Saratoga Springs Resort & Spa contains the Disney Vacation Club Preview Center, the official open house and sales center for the Disney Vacation Club. The center includes a preview lobby and several full-scale model villas of the latest Disney Vacation Club resorts.

Walt Disney World Conference Center 
The Walt Disney World Conference Center was a chalet-style building that was designed for small and medium-sized business meetings. It opened in August 1980 along the banks of Club Lake and was then converted into part of the Disney Institute. It was later demolished when construction began on the Disney's Saratoga Springs Resort & Spa, which now stands on the grounds of the former Institute.

The conference center had four rooms which could be broken down into several configurations. Each meeting room faced the lake and had automatic lighting that would turn on when external light conditions required them. Meeting planners could have themed entertainment with the Disney characters as well as the ability to arrange for a round of golf or a tennis match. The conference center could not handle large conventions and the large groups were forced to use newly created meeting spaces at the Walt Disney World Dolphin, Walt Disney World Swan, Disney's Contemporary Resort, and Disney's Grand Floridian Resort & Spa hotels, which resulted in the closure of the conference center.

References

External links 
 

Disney Vacation Club
Hotels established in 2004
Hotel buildings completed in 2004
2004 establishments in Florida